Stoffel is a Dutch-language given name and German-language surname derived from a diminutive of a reduced form of Christoffer. Like the related Stoffer it has thus emerged from the medieval personal name of Greek origin Christopher with the literal meaning "bearer of christ".
Notable people with the name include:

Given name 
 Stoffel Botha (1929–1998), South African politician
 Stoffel Muller (1776–1833), Dutch Protestant religious leader
 Stoffel du Plessis (1932–2000), South African middleweight boxer
 Stoffel Steyn (born 1941), South African boxer
 Stoffel Vandoorne (born 1992), Belgian professional racing driver

Surname 
 Alice Stoffel (1905–1983), French swimmer
 André Ernesto Stoffel (born 1960), Brazilian former basketball player
 Charles Stoffel  (1893–1970), Swiss sportsman
 Dale Stoffel  (1961–2004), American businessman and arms dealer
 Jacob Stoffel Jr. (1861–1927), American businessman and politician
 Josy Stoffel (born 1928), Luxembourgian gymnast
 Michel Stoffel (1903–1963), Luxembourg artist and author
 Yvonne Stoffel-Wagener (1931–2014), Luxembourgian gymnast

References

Dutch masculine given names
German-language surnames
Surnames from given names